Kaltyayevo (Qältäw) is a rural locality (a selo) and the administrative centre of Kaltyayevsky Selsoviet, Tatyshlinsky District, Bashkortostan, Russia. The population was 573 as of 2010. There are six streets.

Geography 
Kaltyayevo is located 7 km southeast of Verkhniye Tatyshly (the district's administrative centre) by road. Vyazovka is the nearest rural locality.

References 

Rural localities in Tatyshlinsky District